Three for the Road is an American drama television series that aired on CBS from September 14 to November 30, 1975. The series follows two brothers and their recently widowed father, who travel around the country in a recreational vehicle.

Cast
Alex Rocco as Pete Karras
Vincent Van Patten as John Karras
Leif Garrett as Endy Karras

Episodes

Production

Reception

References

External links
 

1975 American television series debuts
1975 American television series endings
1970s American drama television series
CBS original programming
English-language television shows
Television series by MTM Enterprises

Television shows set in Texas